Mohammed Amyn (also written Amine, born 25 March 1976) is a Moroccan long-distance runner.

International competitions

Personal bests
1500 metres - 3:34.81 min (1999)
3000 metres - 7:35.35 min (2001)
5000 metres - 13:01.98 min (2002)
10,000 metres - 27:22.67 min (2005)
Half marathon - 1:01:31 hrs (2006)

External links

1976 births
Living people
Moroccan male long-distance runners
Moroccan male middle-distance runners
Olympic athletes of Morocco
Athletes (track and field) at the 2004 Summer Olympics
World Athletics Championships athletes for Morocco
Mediterranean Games gold medalists for Morocco
Mediterranean Games silver medalists for Morocco
Mediterranean Games medalists in athletics
Athletes (track and field) at the 2001 Mediterranean Games
Athletes (track and field) at the 2005 Mediterranean Games
Athletes (track and field) at the 2009 Mediterranean Games
20th-century Moroccan people
21st-century Moroccan people